Galium suecicum or Swedish bedstraw is a plant species of the  Rubiaceae. It is native to central and southern Sweden, and has also been collected in Germany.

References

External links
Den virtualla floran, Backmåra, Galium suecicum (Sterner) Ehrend.
Blumen in Schwaben, Arten der Artengruppe Galium pusillum agg. (see number 8 at bottom of page, Schwedisches Labkraut, Galium suecicum)

Plants described in 1926
Flora of Sweden
Flora of Germany
suecicum